Mark Greenstreet (born 19 April 1960) is a British actor who first came to prominence in the 1985 BBC television serial Brat Farrar. First and foremost a stage actor, Greenstreet played many of the great leading roles from the works of Shakespeare, Chekhov, and Ibsen to Orton, Wilde, and Coward in the UK and around the world in the 1980s and 1990s.

His most high-profile screen role is probably the part of Mike Hardy in the BBC horseracing drama Trainer, which was shown from 1991 to 1992. In 1986, he auditioned for the part of James Bond in The Living Daylights. Fans of the science-fiction series Doctor Who may remember Greenstreet's performance as Ikona in the 1987 serial Time and the Rani.

He directed and co-wrote his first feature film Caught in the Act in 1995, wrote and directed the highly acclaimed short film The 13th Protocol in 2005, and wrote and directed the psychological thriller Silent Hours starring James Weber Brown, Dervla Kirwan, Indira Varma, and Hugh Bonneville through UK production company Gallery Pictures in 2018. Prior to its release, however, with the burgeoning worldwide audience demand for high-quality TV drama and on-demand box sets, the film's producers were approached to recut and release Silent Hours not as a film, but as a TV miniseries. Set in the naval city of Portsmouth in the run-up to Easter 2002, the gripping and darkly disturbing three 1-hour miniseries Silent Hours (Ep1: "The Silent Service", Ep2: "The Midnight Tide", Ep3: "Towards The Sea") is currently ready for worldwide release through French international distributor Fizz-e-Motion.

Personal life
Mark is the great-nephew of Hollywood actor Sydney Greenstreet.

External links 

British male television actors
Living people
1960 births
British male stage actors